The National Defence and Armed Forces Committee is one of the eight standing committees of the French National Assembly.

Chairwoman 

 Françoise Dumas - 15th legislature of the French Fifth Republic

References 

Military of France
Committees of the National Assembly (France)